Warren Du Preez and Nick Thornton Jones are a London-based photographic and filmmaking duo whose work spans fashion, film, art, scenography and music; together they form W+N Studio.

Lives and careers 
Du Preez, a self-taught photographer originally from Johannesburg, arrived in London in 1989 and began shooting for magazines in 1992 with his 1st editorial for the face magazine . Thornton Jones started his career as art director, they began collaborating in the late nineties and have worked together ever since.

Fashion photography – magazines 
Du Preez and Thornton Jones’ work has featured in many international fashion magazines including I-D; Visionaire; Big Magazine; Numero; V Magazine and The New York Times

Advertising campaigns 
Represented by Talent and Partner in New York and Paris, they have created TV commercials for beauty, fashion and automotive clients including Lancôme; BMW; Pepé Jeans; Schweppes and Perrier Jouët. They have also photographed print campaigns for Issey Miyake; Boucheron; Cartier; Mercedes Benz; Absolut; Hermes; Thierry Mugler and Levi's.

Music 
Over the last decade, the duo has worked extensively with Icelandic pop star Björk and won the cannes lions grand prix for their groundbreaking virtual reality experience NOTGET and British DJ, producer and electronic recording artist, James Lavelle and his collective UNKLE for whom they directed the music videos: Follow Me Down and The Runaway Film – both from the album Where Did the Night Fall. They also created the album art for Where Did the Night Fall and its follow-up album Another Night Out.
They have also collaborated with British trip-hop/electro group Massive Attack.

Fashions shows and scenography 
In October 2007 they devised the theatrical showpiece light installation for La Dame Bleue – the SS08 show from late British fashion designer, Alexander McQueen.

Filmmaking – art projects 
In 2013 Du Preez & Thornton Jones directed Erebus – a filmic response to British choreographer Russell Maliphant's staging of The Rodin Project, created in tandem with Sadler's Wells theatre, London. Initially previewed at the British Film Institute (BFI), in collaboration with gallerist Siobhan Andrews of Daydreaming Projects, the Erebus project was also exhibited as a film, series of static artworks as well as an exterior installation during London's Frieze Art Fair, 2013.

In 2017 they won the Cannes Grand Prix award for their VR project Not Get in their collaboration with Bjork with their exec producer Campbell Beaton.

Exhibitions 
2013 – Erebus – London Newcastle Gallery, solo show, London
2012 – DAYDREAMING – THE HONG KONG EDITION group show, Artistree, Hong Kong
2011 – Vinyl Factory & Daydreaming WHEN THE NIGHT FALLS, solo show, London
2010 – Haunch of Venison & DAYDREAMING group show, London
2009 – Phillips de Pury – NOW group show, London
2009 – 20 Hoxton Square projects & Shelter group show, London
2008 – Lazarides Gallery – Unkle War Paint show with Robert Del Naja, London
2008 – Prêt a Porter – Solo Show, Paris
2007 – In the Making: Fashion & Advertising, National Portrait Gallery group show, London
2004 – solo shows at the Issey Miyake Ropongi store, Tokyo and Conduit Street, London.
2002 – Colette – 5th Birthday – solo exhibition, Paris
2001 – Visionaries Exquisite Corpse group exhibition, São Paulo, Brazil / Paul Kasmin Gallery
2001 – "A Decade ‘Dreaming in Print" – Visionaire magazine exhibition at Fashion Institute of Technology (FIT), New York

Installations 
2009 – Lightform installation performance with Unkle music collective, De La Warr Pavilion, East Sussex, UK 2009.
2007 – Bird of Light, Alexander McQueen S/S 2008 show collaboration (lightform installation).
2005 – Institute Contemporary Arts (ICA) – Mutation film installation / Fashioning the future, London
2004 – Fashion at Belsay, Zero G film installation in collaboration with Hamish Morrow, Northumberland, UK
2003 – TATE magazine art + fashion, feature x collaboration with Issey Miyake, London

Books 
2005 – Fashioning the Future, published by Thames & Hudson
2003 – Gas Book 14, Warren du Preez and Nick Thornton Jones, published by Takeyuki Fuji
2002 – Book One, published by Studio/Colette.

References

Filmmaking duos
Cultural organisations based in London